Agnes Mpingana Kafula (born 1 November 1955) is a Namibian politician who has served as mayor of Windhoek from November 2012 to December 2014. She is a survivor of the Cassinga massacre of 4 May 1978.

During her tenure as mayor of the City of Windhoek, Kafula was involved in dubious land sale deals by awarding land at discount prices to friends and family, resulting in the mass land demonstration in Windhoek.

References

1955 births
Living people
Mayors of Windhoek
SWAPO politicians
Women mayors of places in Namibia
21st-century Namibian women politicians
20th-century Namibian politicians
21st-century Namibian politicians